HD 136418 b, also known by its proper name  Awasis, is an extrasolar planet orbiting the G-type star HD 136418 approximately 320 light years away in the constellation Boötes It has a notable orbit, staying within the known habitable zone. It also has a star very similar in temperature as the Sun.

It was named "Awasis" by representatives of Canada in the 2019 NameExoWorlds contest held by the IAU, named after the Cree word for "child". In the same competition, The planet's parent star HD 136418 was named Nikawiy after the Cree word for "mother".

See also
 HD 4313 b
 HD 181342 b
 HD 206610 b
 HD 180902 b
 HD 212771 b

References

External links
 

Exoplanets discovered in 2009
Exoplanets detected by radial velocity
Boötes
Giant planets
Exoplanets with proper names